Norman Saleet (born Norman Sallitt) is an American songwriter, musician, and actor. He is best known for writing Air Supply's 1981 hit "Here I Am". The song was chosen for the band by record producer Clive Davis.

Saleet is from Butler, Pennsylvania.

Saleet began playing the guitar at the age of 15 and founded a band, the Good Family, at 18. The band enjoyed some local popularity in Western Pennsylvania.

Discography
Saleet has recorded one album, Here I Am, for RCA Records. The album is described by Billboard as being adult contemporary, similar in style to Saleet's "Here I Am" hit written for the band Air Supply. The album features mostly ballads, while "Magic in the Air" and "Lines" are more energetic and are Billboards picks from the album. The two songs were also released as singles, in addition to "Hang On In". "Magic in the Air" earned Saleet the American Song Festival award in the professional Top 40 category.

The album features the following songs:

Songs

Filmography

References

External links

American male singer-songwriters
Singer-songwriters from Pennsylvania
Living people
Year of birth missing (living people)